John P. Jefferson House, also known as the Jefferson Tea House and YWCA Residence, is a historic home located at Warren, Warren County, Pennsylvania.  It was built in 1890, and is a three-story, stone and shingled dwelling in a Richardsonian Romanesque style.  It features a steep hipped roof, four tall chimney stacks, a semi-circular turret, porch supported by massive stone columns, and bay windows.
The Jefferson House is currently occupied by the administrative offices of the Northern Pennsylvania Regional College.

It was added to the National Register of Historic Places in 1985.

References

Houses on the National Register of Historic Places in Pennsylvania
Houses completed in 1890
Houses in Warren County, Pennsylvania
National Register of Historic Places in Warren County, Pennsylvania
Buildings and structures in Warren, Pennsylvania